The Ugly Story is a 1966 Soviet comedy film directed by Aleksandr Alov and Vladimir Naumov.

Plot 
The actual state adviser Ivan Ilyich Pralinsky had the idea that if he is humane, then people will love him, they will believe him, and therefore they will believe in state reform and will love it. Consequently, his personal qualities acquire important social significance.

On a winter evening, while he was a guest, Ivan Ilyich, without waiting for the crew, went home on foot and accidentally went out to the house of Pseldonimov, one of his small servants. A wedding was celebrated there, and the general, full of noble intentions, went to congratulate the young.

Cast 
 Yevgeny Yevstigneyev as Pralinsky
 Viktor Sergachyov as Pseldonimov
 Aleksandr Gruzinsky as Mlekopitayev
 Elena Ponsova as Mlekopitayeva
 Elizaveta Nikishchikhina as Bride
 Zoya Fyodorova as Pseldonimov's mother
 Gleb Strizhenov as Klerk
 Pavel Pavlenko as Akim Petrovich

References

External links 
 

1966 films
1960s Russian-language films
Soviet comedy films
Films directed by Aleksandr Alov
Films directed by Vladimir Naumov
1966 comedy films
Films based on works by Fyodor Dostoyevsky
Soviet black-and-white films
Mosfilm films